John Paul Morse (born February 16, 1958) is an American professional golfer who currently plays on the Champions Tour.

Amateur career
Morse was born in Marshall, Michigan. He attended the University of Michigan and was an All-American member of the golf team and Big-10 Champion in 1980. He won the 1978 Michigan Amateur and was the Big 10 Championship individual medalist in 1980. He turned professional in 1981.

Professional career
Morse began his career playing in tournaments in and around his home state of Michigan and eventually the Florida Tour.

Morse first made a name for himself on the Australasian Tour. One of Morse's finest performances on the Australasian Tour came in a runner-up performance in 1990. At that year's Australian Masters, Morse finished only two shots back from world number one Greg Norman while tying world number two Nick Faldo. Later in the year he would improve on that performance defeating Norman and Faldo, who remained #1 and #2 in the world, at the Australian Open. The win helped Morse move up to a world ranking high of #67 by the beginning of the next year.

In 1993, Morse returned to the United States in an attempt to earn his PGA Tour card. He played on the developmental Nike Tour and played very well, ultimately winning the 1993 Nike New England Classic. He earned his PGA Tour card by finishing fifth on the 1993 Nike Tour money list. He was 35 years old when he joined the tour. 

Morse played full-time from 1994 to 1998. He was never a star on tour but did record a win the 1995 Hawaiian Open. He finished 42nd on the 1995 Money List. The following year he recorded his best finish at a major championship: solo 4th at the 1996 U.S. Open. In addition Morse picked up a runner-up finish at the 1995 Buick Challenge.

John Morse came to the 72nd Hole of the 1996 U.S. Open at 1-under par and only one stroke off the lead held by Steve Jones and Tom Lehman and tied with Davis Love III, who had just completed play at 279.  Morse hit the fairway off the 18th tee then hit the green in regulation leaving himself a putt of just over 30 feet for a birdie to tie the lead.  His birdie attempt ran some 4 feet past and the ball lipped out on his comeback putt for par.  Morse finished the U.S. Open at EVEN for a total of 280 and 4th place alone.   

Morse joined the Champions Tour in 2008. His best finish was T-3 at the 2008 AT&T Championship.

Morse was known for using very heavy golf clubs, much heavier than his contemporaries.

Morse was inducted into the Michigan Golf Hall of Fame in 2006.

Amateur wins
1978 Michigan Amateur
1980 Big 10 Championship (individual medalist)

Professional wins (6)

PGA Tour wins (1)

PGA Tour of Australasia wins (3)

PGA Tour of Australasia playoff record (1–0)

Nike Tour wins (1)

Canadian Tour wins (1)

Results in major championships

CUT = missed the half-way cut
"T" = tied

See also
1993 Nike Tour graduates
1997 PGA Tour Qualifying School graduates

References

External links

American male golfers
Michigan Wolverines men's golfers
PGA Tour golfers
PGA Tour Champions golfers
Korn Ferry Tour graduates
Golfers from Michigan
Sportspeople from Battle Creek, Michigan
1958 births
Living people